Kawlin Township  is a township in Kawlin District (formerly part of Katha District)  in the Sagaing Division of Burma. The principal town is Kawlin.

Administrative divisions
Kawlin Township is divided into eight wards. The rural villages, of which there are 202, are grouped into forty-six "village groups" (ကျေးရွာအုပ်စုအရေအတွက်).

References

External links
Maplandia World Gazetteer - map showing the township boundary

Townships of Sagaing Region